Sage oils are essential oils that come in several varieties:

Dalmatian sage oil 
Also called English, Garden, and True sage oil. Made by steam distillation of Salvia officinalis partially dried leaves. Yields range from 0.5 to 1.0%. A colorless to yellow liquid with a warm camphoraceous, thujone-like odor and sharp and bitter taste. The main components of the oil are thujone (50%), camphor, pinene, and cineol.

Clary sage oil 
Sometimes called muscatel. Made by steam or water distillation of Salvia sclarea flowering tops and foliage. Yields range from 0.7 to 1.5%. A pale yellow to yellow liquid with a herbaceous odor and a winelike bouquet. Produced in large quantities in France, Russia and Morocco. The oil contains linalyl acetate, linalool and other terpene alcohols (sclareol), as well as their acetates.

Spanish sage oil 
Made by steam distillation of Salvia lavandulifolia leaves and twigs. A colorless to pale yellow liquid with the characteristic camphoraceous odor. Unlike Dalmatian sage oil, Spanish sage oil contains no or only traces of thujone; camphor and eucalyptol are the major components.

Greek sage oil 
Made by steam distillation of Salvia triloba leaves. Grows in Greece and Turkey. Yields range from 0.25% to 4%. The oil contains camphor, thujone, and pinene, the dominant component being eucalyptol.

Judaean sage oil 
Made by steam distillation of Salvia judaica leaves. The oil contains mainly cubebene and ledol.

References 

Essential oils
Flavors